Hell Unleashed is the fifth studio album by British thrash metal band Evile, released on 30 April 2021 by Napalm Records. It is the band's first studio album since Skull (2013), making it their longest gap between studio albums to date. It also marks the first album to feature Adam Smith, who replaced original lead vocalist and rhythm guitarist Matt Drake, and the first to feature lead guitarist Ol Drake on vocal duties.

Background
In 2013, Ol Drake left Evile and released his debut solo album, Old Rake, in 2015, before subsequently re-joining in 2018. The band announced Matt Drake's departure in August 2020, the latter citing family commitments and recurring health setbacks as reasons for leaving. Ol replaced Matt on vocal duties, whilst Adam Smith, guitarist and vocalist of RipTide, joined as the new rhythm guitarist. Wanting to keep familiar faces in the band, Ol said taking on vocal duties "made sense" to him. He cited Chuck Schuldiner of Death as "one of [his] heroes". In December 2020, Evile announced the recording of a new studio album; the first in seven years.

Writing
Ol describes Evile's writing style as "more aggressive" in comparison to Evile's previous outings, citing Sepultura and the death metal genre as influences. The band had not written any new material since 2013, which Ol described as "old" and not the approach the band "wanted to go for this time around". In part, the latter is why they chose to collaborate with Chris Clancy instead of long-term Evile producer Russ Russell.

Reception
The title track is the first single, unveiled on 3 February 2021 alongside the official music video, directed by James Mansell. The follow-up to this was the second single and video for "Gore", also directed by James Mansell. The third and final single/video was for the song "The Thing (1982)". The album was released on 30 April 2021 via Napalm Records.

Track listing
The track listing was unveiled in February 2021.

Personnel

Band members
Ol Drake – vocals, lead guitar
Ben Carter – drums
Joel Graham – bass
Adam Smith – rhythm guitar

Additional 
 Michael Whelan – cover artwork
 Gustave Doré – CD/vinyl booklet images
 Brian Posehn – backing vocals
 Chris Clancy – producer
 Ol Drake – co-producer
 Maria de Lacruz Balcells – booklet sketches

Charts

Notes

References

2021 albums
Evile albums
Death metal albums by English artists